Mussahi (Masa'i) is a village and the center of Mussahi District, Kabul Province,  Afghanistan. The village was seriously damaged during the two decades of wars that were fought in the country, and is now undergoing a rehabilitation process.

See also 
Kabul Province

References 

Populated places in Kabul Province